Douglas McNeil III (born July 22, 1988) is an American football wide receiver for the FCF Wild Aces of Fan Controlled Football (FCF). He has previously played for the Seattle Seahawks of the National Football League (NFL) and the Portland Thunder of the Arena Football League (AFL). He attended Virginia Tech, James Madison University and Bowie State University and was a member of their football team. Over his three-year career at Bowie State, he made 84 receptions for 1,407 yards and 11 touchdowns.

Professional career

Portland Thunder
In November 2013, McNeil signed with the Portland Thunder.

Denver Broncos
On October 28, 2014, McNeil was signed to seattle.

Seattle Seahawks
On February 4, 2015, McNeil was signed by the Seattle Seahawks. On September 5, 2015, he was waived. On November 18, 2015, he was re-signed to the practice squad.

On December 3, 2015, the Seattle Seahawks released McNeil from their practice squad.  On December 9, 2015 McNeil was put back onto the Seattle Seahawks practice squad.

On September 3, 2016, McNeil was released by the Seahawks as part of final roster cuts.

BC Lions 
On September 19, 2016, McNeil was signed to the BC Lions practice squad.

Albany Empire 
On March 21, 2018, McNeil was assigned to the Albany Empire. On May 7, 2018, he was placed on recallable reassignment.

Baltimore Brigade
On May 23, 2018, McNeil was assigned to the Baltimore Brigade. On May 31, 2018, McNeil was placed on recallable reassignment.

Washington Valor
On June 27, 2018, McNeil was assigned to the Washington Valor.

Fan Controlled Football
On February 10, 2021, McNeil was drafted by the Wild Aces of Fan Controlled Football.

References

External links
 
 Canadian Football League profile

1988 births
Living people
Players of American football from Baltimore
American football wide receivers
Virginia Tech Hokies football players
James Madison Dukes football players
Bowie State Bulldogs football players
Portland Thunder players
Denver Broncos players
Seattle Seahawks players
Albany Empire (AFL) players
Baltimore Brigade players
Washington Valor players
Fan Controlled Football players